Georges Vantongerloo (24 November 1886, Antwerp – 5 October 1965, Paris) was a Belgian abstract sculptor and painter and founding member of the De Stijl group.

Life
From 1905 to 1909 Vantongerloo studied Fine Art at the Fine Art Academies in Antwerp and Brussels. Conscripted into World War I, he was wounded in a gas attack and discharged from the army in 1914. In 1916 he met Theo van Doesburg, and the following year he was a co-signator of the first manifesto of the De Stijl group. Vantongerloo moved to Paris in 1927 and began a correspondence with the Belgian Prime Minister, Henri Jaspar, in relation to the design of a bridge over the Scheldt at Antwerp. In 1930 he joined the Cercle et Carré group in Paris, and a year later he was a founding member of Abstraction-Création.

From 1955 Vantongerloo had a long friendship with the Swedish sculptor Gert Marcus.

Legacy
Once Vantongerloo died in 1965, Max Bill, a close friend of his, began advocating for him. Bill's widow, the art historian Angela Thomas Schmid, set up the Max Bill Georges Vantongerloo Stiftung to support the legacy of both artists. On the art market, the estate has been represented by Hauser & Wirth since 2019.

References

External links
 

1886 births
1965 deaths
Abstract painters
De Stijl
Royal Academy of Fine Arts (Antwerp) alumni
20th-century Belgian painters
20th-century Belgian sculptors
Académie Royale des Beaux-Arts alumni